Eiconaxius andamanensis is a species of decapod crustacean in the infraorder Thalassinidea. Although it is not a true lobster, is sometimes known by the common names "mud lobster" and "scorpion lobster".

Although very similar to Iconasioptis laccadivensis, a species which shelters itself in the branches of deep sea zoophytes, the exact habits of Eiconaxius andamanensis are unknown.

References

Thalassinidea
Crustaceans described in 1900